Ariton is a town in Dale County, Alabama, United States. At the 2020 census, the population was 662. It was incorporated in April 1906. The name is a blend of its two predecessor town names: Ariosto and Charlton.

Ariton is part of the Ozark Micropolitan Statistical Area.

Geography
Ariton is located in northwestern Dale County at  (31.598204, -85.718761). Alabama State Routes 51 and 123 pass through the center of town as Main Street. AL 51 leads northeast  to Clio and southwest  to U.S. Route 231, while AL 123 leads west  to US 231 and southeast  to Ozark, the Dale County seat.

Demographics

Town of Ariton

Ariton first appeared on the 1910 U.S. Census as an incorporated town.

2000 Census data
At the 2000 census there were 772 people, 306 households, and 220 families in the town. The racial makeup of the town was 69.30% White, 29.27% Black or African American, 0.13% Native American, and 1.30% from two or more races. 0.78%. were Hispanic or Latino of any race.

Of the 306 households 39.2% had children under the age of 18 living with them, 47.1% were married couples living together, 20.6% had a female householder with no husband present, and 27.8% were non-families. 26.5% of households were one person and 15.7% were one person aged 65 or older. The average household size was 2.52 and the average family size was 3.02.

The age distribution was 28.5% under the age of 18, 8.4% from 18 to 24, 27.7% from 25 to 44, 18.4% from 45 to 64, and 17.0% 65 or older. The median age was 36 years. For every 100 females, there were 84.2 males. For every 100 females age 18 and over, there were 72.0 males.

The median household income was $21,083 and the median family income  was $25,781. Males had a median income of $27,250 versus $17,639 for females. The per capita income for the town was $11,502. About 25.1% of families and 25.9% 55 of the population were below the poverty line, including 34.5% of those under age 18 and 22.2% of those age 65 or over.

2020 Census data

As of the 2020 United States census, there were 662 people, 272 households, and 182 families residing in the town.

Historic Demographics

Ariton Census Division (1960-70)

Ariton Census Division was created in 1960 after the merger/reorganization of county precincts into census divisions. In 1980, it was consolidated into the Ozark Census Division.

Climate
The climate in this area is characterized by hot, humid summers and generally mild to cool winters.  According to the Köppen Climate Classification system, Ariton has a humid subtropical climate, abbreviated "Cfa" on climate maps.

Notable people
Eunice Hutto Morelock, pioneer faculty member at Bob Jones College and possibly the first female chief academic officer of a coeducational college in the United States
Willie Mae "Big Mama" Thornton, American rhythm and blues singer and songwriter

References

Notes

References

Towns in Dale County, Alabama
Towns in Alabama
Enterprise–Ozark micropolitan area